Elanga is a name that may refer to the following notable people:
Given name
Elanga Buala, (1964–2021), sprinter from Papua New Guinea
Elanga Wikramanayake, Sri Lankan lawyer 

Surname
Anthony Elanga (born 2002), Swedish football player
Joseph Elanga (born 1979), Cameroonian football defender 
Pierre Hervé Ateme Elanga (born 1986), Cameroonian football player 

Sinhalese masculine given names